Benjamin Watt may refer to:
 Ben Watt (born 1962), musician